Fasoracetam  is a research chemical of the racetam family. It is a putative nootropic that failed to show sufficient efficacy in clinical trials for vascular dementia.  It is currently being studied for its potential use for attention deficit hyperactivity disorder.

Fasoracetam appears to agonize all three groups of metabotropic glutamate receptors and has improved cognitive function in rodent studies. It is orally bioavailable and is excreted mostly unchanged via the urine.

Fasoracetam was discovered by scientists at the Japanese pharmaceutical company Nippon Shinyaku, which brought it through Phase 3 clinical trials for vascular dementia, and abandoned it due to lack of efficacy.

Scientists at Children's Hospital of Philadelphia led by Hakon Hakonarson have studied fasoracetam's potential use in attention deficit hyperactivity disorder. Hakonarson started a company called neuroFix Therapeutics to try to bring the drug to market for this use; neuroFix acquired Nippon Shinyaku's clinical data as part of its efforts.   neuroFix was acquired by Medgenics in 2015.  Medgenics changed its name to Aevi Genomic Medicine in 2016.  Clinical trials in adolescents with ADHD who also have mGluR mutations started in 2016. While Fasoracetam may be effective in the treatment of ADHD in people with specific mGluR mutations, these represent around 10% of total ADHD cases, and Fasoracetam is likely ineffective in all other cases. Studies showing improvements in cognitive function from Fasoracetam have exclusively been done on rodents.

Legality

Australia 
Fasoracetam is a schedule 4 substance in Australia under the Poisons Standard (February 2020). A  schedule 4 substance is classified as "Prescription Only Medicine, or Prescription Animal Remedy – Substances, the use or supply of which should be by or on the order of persons permitted by State or Territory legislation to prescribe and should be available from a pharmacist on prescription."

See also
 Drug repositioning

References

Racetams
1-Piperidinyl compounds
Carboxamides
Nootropics